La Cubierta is a bullring in Leganés, Spain. It is currently used for bull fighting and concerts. The stadium holds 10,000 spectators. It was opened in 1997.

References

External links

La Cubierta
Sports venues in the Community of Madrid
Sport in Leganés
Buildings and structures in Leganés